J. Mercer Burrell was a state legislator from New Jersey in the 1930s.

He was born in Richmond, Virginia.

He represented teenagers wanting to establish the Phi Delta Kappa sorority in Newark, New Jersey. He served in the New Jersey State House in 1933 and 1935.

He represented the "Trenton Six". In 1947, Dr. J. O. Hill said the Essex County Colored Republican Council was being represented by Burrell as it sought to change the bill of rights.

References

Republican Party New Jersey state senators
20th-century American politicians
African-American state legislators in New Jersey
Year of birth missing
Year of death missing
People from Richmond, Virginia
African-American men in politics